Pimitespib (trade name Jeselhy) is a drug for the treatment of gastrointestinal stromal tumors.  It was discovered and developed by Taiho Pharmaceutical Co.  The mechanism of action of pimitespib involves inhibition of heat shock protein 90 (Hsp90).

In June 2022, it received approval in Japan for gastrointestinal stromal tumors that have progressed after chemotherapy.

References 

Antineoplastic drugs
Pyrazoles
Benzamides
Imidazoles
Pyrazolopyridines